Gerald Antonio Riggs Jr. (born September 28, 1983) is a former gridiron football running back. He played college football at Tennessee. He is the son of former Pro Bowl running back Gerald and ex-wife Dana Riggs.

Early years
Riggs attended Red Bank High School in Red Bank, Tennessee. He helped lead the team to an undefeated season, 15-0, and the school's first state championship in football during the 2000 season. Riggs also won the Tennessee Mr. Football trophy that season. He played in the 2002 U.S. Army All-American Bowl

College career
Riggs was one of two different 1,000 plus yard rushers for Tennessee in the 2004 season. He and Cedric Houston both had 1,000 plus yards that season. This was the first time in Tennessee football history to have multiple 1,000 yard rushers in a season.
Riggs was a preseason All-American and Heisman Trophy candidate in 2005, but a lower leg injury ended his senior season. Riggs finished with over 2,000 all-purpose yards and 18 touchdown despite injuries early in career that kept him off the field

Professional career

Miami Dolphins
Riggs entered the 2006 NFL Draft, but was not selected, partly due to concerns about his injury status. After the draft, Riggs signed a free agent contract with the Miami Dolphins. He was released by the team on September 2, re-signed to the practice squad on September 3 and then released again on September 5. He spent the season out of football.

Chicago Bears
Riggs was signed by the Chicago Bears on February 9, 2007. He was assigned to the Rhein Fire of NFL Europa during the offseason. The Bears released him on May 23.

Detroit Lions
Riggs worked out at a Detroit Lions minicamp in May 2009 but was not signed.

Toronto Argonauts
On May 31, 2011, Riggs signed with the Toronto Argonauts of the Canadian Football League. Riggs received 35 rushing attempts during the 2012 CFL season, amassing 220 yards and 1 touchdown. On June 22, 2013 Riggs was released by the Argos.

Personal life
His father, Gerald Riggs, was a three-time Pro Bowl running back for the Atlanta Falcons and Washington Redskins. His brother, Cody Riggs, played cornerback for the Notre Dame Fighting Irish in college and signed as an undrafted free agent with the Tennessee Titans in 2015.

References

External links
Tennessee Volunteers bio

1983 births
Living people
Players of American football from Atlanta
Players of Canadian football from Atlanta
People from Chattanooga, Tennessee
African-American players of American football
African-American players of Canadian football
American football running backs
Canadian football running backs
Tennessee Volunteers football players
Miami Dolphins players
Chicago Bears players
Rhein Fire players
Toronto Argonauts players
21st-century African-American sportspeople
20th-century African-American people